Danil Yerdakov (born 4 June 1989) is a Russian professional ice hockey player. He is currently with Metallurg Novokuznetsk of the Supreme Hockey League (VHL).

Yerdakov made his Kontinental Hockey League (KHL) debut playing with HC Spartak Moscow during the 2012–13 KHL season.

References

External links

1989 births
Living people
Kazzinc-Torpedo players
HC Kuban players
Lokomotiv Yaroslavl players
HC Mechel players
Metallurg Novokuznetsk players
HC Spartak Moscow players
Russian ice hockey forwards
Saryarka Karagandy players
Sokol Krasnoyarsk players
Sportspeople from Chelyabinsk